Arnold Lewis Raphel (March 16, 1943 – August 17, 1988) was the 18th United States Ambassador to Pakistan.

Early life and education
Raphel was born March 16, 1943, in Troy, New York, into a Jewish family, the son of Harry and Sarah (Rote-Rosen) Raphel.

As a boy, Raphel was already interested in diplomacy and international affairs. At age 12, he wrote to the then Secretary of State, John Foster Dulles, regarding his interest in diplomacy. Dulles wrote back in reply, advising him to "study hard, work hard and we’ll see you in ten years." Raphel graduated from Hamilton College (B.A., 1964) and the Maxwell School at Syracuse University (M.A., 1966).

Career
Raphel joined the US State Department in 1966. He held a variety of positions throughout his career until his death in 1988. He was mainly a diplomat for the US Government.

Iran hostage crisis
In 1979, Raphel was a key member of the State Department's Special Operations Group set up to free the American hostages seized by Iranian militants at the United States Embassy in Tehran.

Office of United States Secretary of State
In 1981, Raphel served as the Special Assistant to Secretary of State Edmund Muskie.
Afterward, he became the Deputy Assistant to the United States Secretary of State in 1985.

Ambassador to Pakistan
Raphel was nominated by President Ronald Reagan and  succeeded Dean Roesch Hinton as US Ambassador to Pakistan in January 1987.

Awards
 Presidential Citizens Medal (1989)

Personal life
Raphel was married three times. His first wife was Myrna Feigenbaum, by whom he had one daughter, Stephanie. In 1978, he married fellow diplomat Robin Raphel; the marriage, which was childless, ended in divorce two years later. In 1987, he married another fellow diplomat, Nancy Halliday Ely-Raphel. They had been married for around a year when he died in an aircrash in August 1988.

Death
Raphel was serving as US ambassador to Pakistan, and was traveling in the plane with President Zia-ul-Haq on August 17, 1988, when the plane crashed, resulting in the death of 34 people, including him and President Zia.

Raphel was 45 years old. He was survived by both his parents, who were living in retirement by then in Atlantic City, N.J., and by his only daughter Stephanie, who was living with her mother, Myrna Feigenbaum, in Orlando, Florida. Raphel was also survived by his third wife, Nancy.

See also
 Adolph Dubs, the previous US ambassador to die in the line of duty
 J. Christopher Stevens, the next U.S. ambassador to die in the line of duty
 US Ambassadors killed in office

References

External links
 Former US Ambassadors to Pakistan
 President Reagan's Statement on the deaths of President Zia-ul-Haq and Arnold Raphel
 Nomination of Arnold Lewis Raphel To Be United States Ambassador to Pakistan
 Arnold L. Raphel, United States Ambassador Arlington National Cemetery
 Congressional gold medal to the family of Arnold Raphel 
 A resolution to express the deep regret of the Senate regarding the death of Ambassador Arnold Lewis Raphel 

1943 births
1988 deaths
20th-century diplomats
20th-century translators
Ambassadors of the United States to Pakistan
American expatriates in Pakistan
American scholars of Pakistan studies
Assassinated American diplomats
Burials at Arlington National Cemetery
Conservatism in Pakistan
English–Urdu translators
Hamilton College (New York) alumni
Jewish American government officials
Jews and Judaism in Pakistan
Syracuse University alumni
Translators from Urdu
Urdu-language writers
Victims of aviation accidents or incidents in 1988
Victims of aviation accidents or incidents in Pakistan
20th-century American Jews